Kershaw is an English-language surname deriving from a topographical identifier in the northern dialect of Middle English: kirk meaning "church" and shaw meaning "grove".  Places named Kirkshaw include Kirkshaw in the parish of Rochdale, Greater Manchester, and two hamlets in West Yorkshire. The Kershaw (anciently spelled "Kyrkeshagh") family resided at Town House, Rochdale from the Middle Ages until the early modern period. 

Notable people with the name include:

 Alex Kershaw (born 1966), American Historian
 Abbey Lee Kershaw (born 1987), Australian fashion model 
 Andy Kershaw (born 1959), British radio DJ
 Anthony Kershaw (1915–2008),  British Conservative Party Member of Parliament 1955 to 1987
 Betty Kershaw (born 1943), British professor of nursing
 Billy Kershaw, rugby league footballer who played in the 2000s
 Bob Kershaw (died 1998), South African fighter pilot in World War II
 Cecil Kershaw (1895–1972), British fencer and rugby union footballer during the 1920s
 Clayton Kershaw (born 1988), US baseball player
 Devon Kershaw (born 1982), Canadian cross-country skier
 Doug Kershaw (born 1936), American fiddle player
 Elinor Kershaw (1884–1971), American actress
 Fraser Kershaw, activist and actor 
 Harry Kershaw, rugby league footballer who played in the 1890s and 1900s
 Harry Clement Kershaw (1906–1985), British trade unionist
 Herbert Kershaw, English rugby union and rugby league footballer who played in the 1900s and 1910s
 H. V. Kershaw (1918–1992), British dramatist
 Ian Kershaw (born 1943), British historian 
 J.C. Kershaw (1871–1959), British entomologist
 Jack Kershaw (1913–2010), American attorney
 John Kershaw (disambiguation), several people
 Joseph B. Kershaw  (1822–1894), Confederate general
 Joseph Franklin Kershaw (1884–1917), English artist
 Kenneth A. Kershaw (1930 - 2019), British-Canadian botanist and lichenologist
 Kim Kershaw (born 1959), Australian rules footballer, father of Abbey Lee Kershaw
 L. R. Kershaw (1880–1969), pioneer Oklahoma settler, developer, banker and cattleman
 Les Kershaw, chief scout and academy director for Manchester United
 Liz Kershaw (born 1958), UK music broadcaster
 Mary Kershaw, US museum director
 Nellie Kershaw (1891–1924), UK textile worker and the first asbestos victim
 Nik Kershaw (born 1958), UK singer-songwriter
 Noreen Kershaw (born 1950), UK actor
 Paul Dudley Kershaw (1926-2006), Cajun singer and musician, Cousin to Doug and Sammy Kershaw, Cajun Artists 
 Peter Kershaw (palynologist), Australian palynologist who did key work on dating Gunditjmara aquaculture
 Peter Kershaw, British tennis player and chairman at Joseph Holt's Brewery
 Richard Kershaw (1934–2014), UK television reporter
 Sammy Kershaw (born 1958), singer and songwriter, a relative of the Cajun fiddler, Doug Kershaw
 Thomas Kershaw (disambiguation), several people
 Willette Kershaw (1882–1960), American actress

See also
 Baron Kershaw

References

English-language surnames